Shrewsbury Inlet was an inlet connecting the Shrewsbury River with the Atlantic Ocean in Monmouth County, New Jersey. The inlet is now closed and the Shrewsbury River connects to Sandy Hook Bay.

Geography
Shrewsbury Inlet separated Sandy Hook from Wardell's Beach, both of which are now connected.  The inlet, which shifted periodically, was approximately located at the boundary between Sea Bright and Middletown Township, at the base of Sandy Hook.

History
Shrewsbury Inlet was described in 1834 as,

Edwin Salter, former Speaker of the New Jersey General Assembly, in 1874 wrote about Shrewsbury Inlet in Old Times in Old Monmouth:

Shrewsbury Inlet was described in 1878, viz.,

By 1856 the construction of a railroad and related protective structures along the spit rendered the closing of the inlet more or less permanent, and access to the Shrewsbury River remains through Sandy Hook Bay.

See also 
Sandy Hook
Wardell's Beach
Shrewsbury River

References 

Inlets of New Jersey
Bodies of water of Monmouth County, New Jersey